Canada's Ambassador for Women, Peace and Security is a diplomatic role, established by the Federal Government of Canada in 2019.

Mandate 
The ambassador works to further the objectives of Canada's feminist foreign policy. The mandate of the role is to "provide confidential assessments and advice to ministers engaged in the implementation of Canada's National Action Plan on WPS [women, peace, and security], and about how Canada can continue to demonstrate global leadership."

History 
The first ambassador, Jacqueline O'Neill, was appointed by Prime Minister Justin Trudeau in June 2019.

References

External links 
 Canada’s ambassador for Women, Peace and Security, Government of Canada

2019 establishments in Canada
Ambassadors of Canada